Golluj (Tigre/Tigrinya: ጎልጅ) is a town in Eritrea. Located in the south-western Gash-Barka region, it is the capital of the Golluj district. Golluj has more arable land per-capita than any other place in Eritrea; therefore, most often it is referred to as the bread basket of Eritrea within the Gash-Barka region. It is very ethnically diverse with vibrant cultures living together in harmony. In addition, Golluj sub division consists of many small towns, such as Omahajer, Gergef, Tebeldiya and Gerset.

References
Statoids.com, retrieved December 8, 2010

Populated places in Eritrea
Gash-Barka Region